Jasmine Rosemary Cresswell (born 1941 in Wales) is a best-selling author of over 50 romance novels as Jasmine Cresswell and Jasmine Craig.

Biography
Jasmine Rosemary Cresswell was born in Wales and educated in London. After graduating early from high school, Cresswell received a diploma in technical French and German from the Lycée Français Charles de Gaulle in London. She then joined the British Foreign office and worked for the British Embassy in Rio de Janeiro, where she met her husband, Malcolm Candlish. The two have lived all over the world, including Australia, Canada, and the United States.

Cresswell received a bachelor's degree in history and philosophy from Melbourne University, a degree in history from Macquarie University, and a master's degree in history and archival administration from Case Western Reserve University. Cresswell began writing in 1975, and has more than 9 million copies of her books in print. She has also written romances under the name Jasmine Craig.

Cresswell has served as the editor of the Romance Writer's Report (the national journal of the Romance Writers of America), as president of Rocky Mountain Fiction Writers, and is a founder and former president of Novelists, Inc. Cresswell is also a member of England's Romance Novelists Association and the Authors' Guild of America.

Cresswell and her husband currently live in Sarasota, Florida and Evergreen, Colorado. They have four children and numerous grandchildren.

Awards
 Colorado Authors' League Award for Best Paperback Novel of the Year
 Romance Writers of America Golden Rose Award
 USA Today Bestsellers List
 two-time Romantic Times Reviewers' Choice Award nominee
 two-time winner of Rocky Mountain Fiction Writer of the Year
 Romance Writers of America's Golden Medallion Award nominee

Bibliography

As Jasmine Cresswell

Romantic Suspense 
 Final Justice, 2005
 Full Pursuit, 2004
 The DeWilde Affair, 2004
 Private Eyes, 2004
 Decoy, 2004
 Colorado Confidential, 2003
 Dead Ringer, 2003
 Veils of Deceit (anthology including Free Fall), 2003
 The Trouble With Love (anthology including The Perfect Bride), 2003
 Everybody's Talking (anthology including Edge of Eternity), 2003
 The Third Wife, 2002
 The Conspiracy, 2001
 The Refuge, 2000
 The Inheritance, 2000
 The Disappearance, 1999
 The Daughter, 1998
 Secret Sins, 1997
 Charades, 1996
 No Sin Too Great, 1996
 Chase the Past, 1995
 Desires and Deceptions, 1995
 Edge of Eternity, 1994
 Keeping Secrets, 1993
 Nowhere to Hide, 1992
 House Guest, 1992
 Charades, 1989
 Free Fall, 1989
 Undercover, 1986

Contemporary Romances
 Trueblood Texas: His Brother's Fiancee, 2001
 Delta Justice, 1997
 He Said, She Said, 1997
 I Do, Again, 1997
 Shattered Vows, 1996
 Midnight Fantasy, 1996
 Forgotten Marriage, 1996
 The Substitute Bride, 1996
 The Rossiter Arrangement, 1996
 Marriage on the Run, 1994
 The Perfect Bride, 1993
 Love for Hire, 1992
 Hunter's Prey, 1986
 Mixed Doubles, 1984

Historical Romances
 Prince of the Night, 1997
 Timeless, 1994
 To Catch the Wind, 1993
 Empire of the Heart, 1993
 The Devil's Envoy, 1992
 The Moreton Scandal, 1986
 Traitor's Heir, 1984
 Lord Rutherford's Affair, 1984
 The Princess, 1982
 Blackwood Bride, 1982
 Lord Carresford's Mistress, 1982
 The Reluctant Viscountess, 1981
 The Danewood Legacy, 1981
 Tarrisbroke Hall, 1981
 Caroline, 1980
 The Abducted Heiress, 1980

As Jasmine Craig

Romances
 Empire of the Heart, 1989
 Knave of Hearts (Second Chance at Love, No 446), 1988
 The Devil's Envoy, 1988
 For Love of Christy (Second Chance at Love, No 396), 1987
 One Step to Paradise (Second Chance at Love, No 318), 1986
 Master Touch (Second Chance at Love, No 274), 1985
 Dear Adam (Second Chance at Love, No 243), 1985
 Under Cover of Night, 1984
 Surprised by Love (Second Chance at Love), 1984
 Refuge in His Arms (Second Chance at Love), 1984
 Imprisoned Heart, 1983
 Tender Triumph (Second Chance at Love), 1983
 Runaway Love, 1982
 Stormy Reunion (Second Chance at Love), 1982

External links
 Jasmine Cresswell Official WebSite
 Biography from The Romance Club

1941 births
Living people
English women novelists
English romantic fiction writers
University of Melbourne alumni
University of Melbourne women
People educated at Lycée Français Charles de Gaulle
Women romantic fiction writers